Miloud Hadefi (March 12, 1949 – June 6, 1994) was an Algerian football player and manager.  Hedefi represented Algeria in two Football World Cup qualifying matches. His preferred position was libero.  He was nicknamed The African Kaiser by Pelé because of his similar style to German defender "Der Kaiser", Franz Beckenbauer.

Honours

Club
MC Oran
Algerian Cup: 1974–75

International
All-Africa Games: Gold medal 1978

References

External links
 Miloud Hadefi statistics - dzfootball

1949 births
1994 deaths
Footballers from Oran
Algerian footballers
Algeria international footballers
ASM Oran players
MC Oran players
WA Tlemcen players
MC Oran managers
African Games gold medalists for Algeria
African Games medalists in football
Association football sweepers
Footballers at the 1973 All-Africa Games
Competitors at the 1978 All-Africa Games
Algerian football managers
20th-century Algerian people